Fathabad (also Romanized as Fatḩābād) is a village in Khorramdasht Rural District, in the Central District of Kuhbanan County, Kerman Province, Iran. At the 2006 census, its population was 120, in 28 families.

References 

Populated places in Kuhbanan County